Oksza - is a Polish coat of arms. It was used by several szlachta families in the times of the Polish–Lithuanian Commonwealth.

Notable bearers
Notable bearers of this coat of arms include:
Jan Kołda
Andrzej Rej (diplomat)
Mikołaj Rej
Nicholas Andrew Rey 
Konstantin Rokossovsky
Paweł Edmund Strzelecki
Stanisław Orzechowski

See also
 Polish heraldry
 Heraldry
 Coat of arms

External links 
 Oksza Coat of Arms and the bearers 

Polish coats of arms